Hamirpur is a city and a municipal board in Hamirpur district in the Indian state of Uttar Pradesh. It is the administrative headquarters of Hamirpur district.

Geography
It has an average elevation of 80 metres (262 feet).

Climate

Demographics
As of the 2011 Census of India, Hamirpur NPP had a population of 35,475, of which 19,027 were males and 16,448 were females. The population in the age range of 0–6 years was 3,940 constituting 11.1% of the total population. The total number of literates were 26,121, which constituted 73.6% of the population with male literacy of 78.7% and female literacy of 67.6%. The effective literacy rate (of 7+ population) of Hamirpur NPP was 82.8%%, of which male literacy rate was 88.5% and female literacy rate was 76.3%. Hamirpur had 6,802 households in 2011.

As of the 2001 Census of India, Hamirpur had a population of 32,035, of which 17,349 were males and 14,686 were females. The population in the age range of 0–6 years was 4,230, constituting 13.2% of the total population. The total number of literates were 22,592, which constituted 70.5% of the total population, with male literacy of 77.5% and female literacy of 62.3%. The effective literacy (of 7+ population) was 81.3%, of which male literacy rate was 89.1% and female literacy rate was 72.0%.

Religion

Majority of the population of Hamirpur are Hindus with 82.5% adherents, followed by Muslims at 17.2%.

Notable people 

 Ashok Kumar Singh Chandel, MLA, BJP
 Niranjan Jyoti, Minister of state
 Kailash Vajpeyi (1936–2015), poet, writer and lyricist

References

 
Cities and towns in Hamirpur district, Uttar Pradesh
Yamuna River
Betwa River
Ahir history
Cities in Bundelkhand